Buena Vista is an unincorporated community in Clinton County, Iowa, United States, located on the north bank of the Wapsipinicon River, almost 7 miles south of Calamus and two miles east of Dixon. From 1849 to 1914, it had a post office, sited in the southwestern part of Section 9 of Olive Township, at the southeast corner of the intersection of 178th Avenue and 298th Street.

History
According to The History of Clinton County, Iowa (1879),

References

Unincorporated communities in Clinton County, Iowa
Unincorporated communities in Iowa